Oliver Campbell defeated the two-time defending champion Henry Slocum in the challenge round, 6–2, 4–6, 6–3, 6–1 to win the men's singles tennis title at the 1890 U.S. National Championships. It was the first of three U.S. Championships titles for Campbell.

Draw

Challenge round

Finals

Earlier rounds

Section 1

Section 2

Section 3

Section 4

References

Sources 
 

Men's singles
1890